Betty Lou Gerson (April 20, 1914 – January 12, 1999) was an American actress, predominantly active in radio but also in film and television and as a voice actress. She is best known as the original voice of Cruella de Vil from the Disney animated film One Hundred and One Dalmatians (1961) for which she was named a Disney Legend in 1996.

Life and career

Early life 
Gerson was born in Chattanooga, Tennessee, on April 20, 1914, but raised in Birmingham, Alabama, where her father was an executive with a steel company. She was Jewish. She was educated in private schools in Birmingham and Miami, Florida. At age 16, she moved with her family to Chicago, where she performed in the radio serial The First Nighter Program. She later moved to New York City.

Radio and film 
She began her acting career in radio drama in 1935, while still in her 20s, and became a mainstay of soap operas during this period, appearing on Arnold Grimm's Daughter (as the titular daughter Constance in 1938), Midstream (in the lead role of Julia), Women in White (as Karen Adams), Road of Life (as Nurse Helen Gowan), Lonely Women (as Marilyn Larimore), and the radio version of The Guiding Light, as Charlotte Wilson in the mid-1940s. She co-starred with Jim Ameche in the 1938 summer drama Win Your Lady and was the resident romantic lead on romantic anthologies such as Curtain Time and Grand Hotel.

Moving to Los Angeles in the 1940s, she established herself on series such as The Whistler, Mr. President (as the presidential secretary), Crime Classics, Escape, and Yours Truly, Johnny Dollar. She was heard in several episodes of Lux Radio Theater, cast in such roles as Glinda in a 1950 dramatization of The Wizard of Oz. She also played a variety of roles on Johnny Modero, Pier 23. In an early example of the comic genius that her Cruella later showcased, she parodied her main radio persona in the Sam Spade detective series, "The Soap Opera Caper" episode which aired on February 16, 1951.

Around this time, she was cast as the narrator in Walt Disney's animated version of Cinderella (1950). Eleven years later, she provided the voice of the villainous, selfish socialite Cruella de Vil in Disney's animated feature One Hundred and One Dalmatians (1961).

Her few on-camera film roles include appearances in The Fly (1958), The Miracle on the Hills (1959), and Mary Poppins (1964) in a small cameo as an old crone. In television, she made three guest appearances on Perry Mason, including the role of murderer Marjory Davis in the episode, "The Case of the Foot-Loose Doll" (1959). She also guest starred on The Twilight Zone, The Dick Van Dyke Show, Hazel,  Wanted Dead or Alive, and The Rifleman.

Family and later life 
In 1936, Gerson married Joseph T. Ainley at Fourth Presbyterian Church in Chicago. At that time, he was radio director of the Leo Burnett Company, Incorporated. The couple remained married until his death in 1965. The union was childless.

Gerson retired in 1966, though still using her voice, working at the telephone answering service of her second husband, Louis R. "Lou" Lauria, to whom she was married from 1966 until his death in 1994. That union was also childless.

She was honored as a Disney Legend in 1996. She returned to films one last time in 1997, providing the voice of Frances in Cats Don't Dance.

Death 
Gerson died from a stroke in Los Angeles on January 12, 1999, at the age of 84.

Filmography 

The Red Menace (1949) as Greta Bloch, alias Yvonne Kraus
Cinderella (1950) as Narrator (voice, uncredited)
Undercover Girl (1950) as Pat (nurse)
An Annapolis Story (1955) as Mrs. Lord
The Walter Winchell File, episode titled "A Day in the Sun", as Minna DiOngu (1957)
The Green-Eyed Blonde (1957) as Mrs. Ferguson (uncredited)
The Fly (1958) as Nurse Andersone
The Miracle of the Hills (1959) as Kate Peacock
One Hundred and One Dalmatians (1961) as Cruella de Vil / Miss Birdwell (voice)
Mary Poppins (1964) as Old Crone (uncredited)
The Trip to Bountiful (1985) as Rosella
Cats Don't Dance (1997) as Frances (voice; final role)
Chip 'n Dale: Rescue Rangers (2022) as Sweet Pete's laugh (archive recordings, posthumous role)

References

External links 

Betty Lou Gerson radiography at Radio Gold Index 
Radio and TV Veteran Betty Lou Gerson Dies
Betty Lou Gerson performances in radio series Yours Truly, Johnny Dollar available in mp3 format for free download at Archive.org

1914 births
1999 deaths
Actresses from Chicago
American radio actresses
American film actresses
Jewish American actresses
Actresses from Birmingham, Alabama
20th-century American actresses
20th-century American Jews